Kondwani Nankhumwa (born July 3, 1978) was the Minister of Local Government in the Democratic Progressive Party (DPP) government led by Prof. Peter Mutharika in Malawi. In July 2018, he was elected the vice president of the DPP for the southern region of Malawi.

Nakhumwa assumed this position after the dismissal of Dr George Chaponda for his alleged involvement in a corruption scandal known as "Maize-gate".he finally join the malawi tonse alliance

References

Living people
Government ministers of Malawi
1978 births